Mappa Hall is a historic home located in Barneveld in Oneida County, New York. It was built 1801-1809 and is a two-story limestone structure in the Federal style. It features a projecting, three bay pavilion surmounted by a pediment with modillion cornice and a single story portico. It was the home of Adam Gerard Mappa, but it is now the home of Lees and Susan Divine.

It was listed on the National Register of Historic Places in 1982.

References

Houses on the National Register of Historic Places in New York (state)
Federal architecture in New York (state)
Houses completed in 1809
Houses in Oneida County, New York
National Register of Historic Places in Oneida County, New York